Nanjing Broadcasting Network, is a television network in the Nanjing, China area.

External links
Official Site 

Television networks in China
Mass media in Nanjing